E-flat may refer to:
 E♭ (musical note)
 E-flat major
 E-flat minor
 E-flat tuning, on a guitar
 "E Flat Boogie", a 1980 single by American funk band Trouble Funk

See also
 E-flat clarinet
 EB (disambiguation)